Madanabhavi is a village in Dharwad district of Karnataka, India.

Demographics 
As of the 2011 Census of India there were 749 households in Madanabhavi and a total population of 3,690 consisting of 1,877 males and 1,813 females. There were 488 children ages 0-6.

References

Villages in Dharwad district